Terry Carling (born 26 February 1939) is an English former footballer who played as a goalkeeper. He played in the Football League for four clubs.

Playing career
Carling began his professional career with Leeds United. He joined them in 1956 but had to wait until 1960–61 for his league debut. He made just five league appearances and played one Football League Cup tie while at Elland Road and moved to Lincoln City in July 1962 on a free transfer.

After two years of regular football for the Imps, Carling joined Walsall and more than 100 league appearances for the Saddlers before switching to Chester in December 1966. He made his debut in a 3–2 win at Bradford City as he replaced Dennis Reeves as regular Chester goalkeeper. Carling was to be a regular for the next three years, with rivals Simon Jones, Grenville Millington and John Taylor restricted to just nine league appearances between them during the period.

During Carling's time at Chester, he helped them reach the Welsh Cup final against Cardiff City in May 1970, marking the end of a season in which he played all 59 first–team matches for the club. He left Chester a year later with a testimonial against Wrexham.

After leaving Chester, Carling joined non–league side Macclesfield Town and worked as a milkman in Chester.

Bibliography

References

External links
Career details
Leeds United stats
Chester 1970–71 team picture featuring Carling

1939 births
Living people
People from Otley
English Football League players
English footballers
Association football goalkeepers
Leeds United F.C. players
Lincoln City F.C. players
Walsall F.C. players
Chester City F.C. players
Macclesfield Town F.C. players